Star Stories is a British television comedy programme that took a satirical look at celebrities and their lives, in the manner of the satirical cartoon Great Pop Things, to which it bears a strong resemblance. It was first shown on Channel 4 on 15 September 2006.

Star Stories is made by Objective Productions commissioned for Channel 4 by Shane Allen and Andrew Newman with Lee Hupfield producing, Elliot Hegarty directing and Phil Clarke and Andrew O'Connor as executive producers.

The Sun reported that Channel 4 had axed Star Stories to free up cash to invest in other shows.

The main theme of the show was the theme from the film Gone with the Wind.

Cast

Guest Starring:
Harry Enfield: Elvis Costello.

Narration was commonly by Simon Greenall. However, the second and fourth episodes of the first series, the first and third episodes in the second series and the first, second and third episodes of the third series were narrated by Steve Edge, Matt King, Dolly Wells and Kevin Bishop in the guise of the lead characters George Michael, Guy Ritchie, Gary Barlow, Simon Cowell, Elton John, Heather Mills and Peter Andre respectively.

Awards and nominations

Viewing figures
Episode one: 3 million (14%)
Episode two: 2.6 million (11%)
Episode three: 2.9 million (13%)
Episode four: 3.1 million (14%)
Average: 2.8 million (13%)

The show's second series attracted over 2 million viewers.

Episodes

Series One, 2006
 David & Victoria - 'Our Story'
 George Michael - 'Watch Without Prejudice vol.1'
 Catherine Zeta-Jones - 'Her Quest To Prove Herself... And Also Find Love'
 Guy Ritchie & Madonna - 'The Wife's Life'
 Sadie Frost - 'My Side Of The Story'
 Jennifer Aniston - 'The One Where Jen's Husband Dumps Her For A Total Bitch'

Series Two, 2007
Take That - 'Barlow Productions Presents: Take That - Why Our Success Was Nothing To Do With Robert Williams'
Tom Cruise - The Church of Scientology Presents: 'Being Tom Cruise - How Scientology Isn't In Any Way Mental'
Simon Cowell - SyCo Productions Presents: 'Simon Cowell - My Honesty, My Genius'
Britney Spears - The State of Louisiana Presents: 'The Ballad of Britney Jean'

Series Three, 2008
Elton John - David Furnish Presents Elton John 'The Patron Saint of Celebrities'
Heather Mills - Heather Mills Presents Mills and McCartney 'Why Paul is a total bastard'
Peter Andre and Jordan (Katie Price) - Peter Andre Presents Me and Katie 'How the moneymoon never ends'
Kate Moss - Top Shop Presents Kate Moss 'My rise, fall, rise, fall again and then rise'
Bono - Bono Presents Christ 2 'My story'

DVD releases
In the UK a DVD containing all six episodes from Series One, an on-set diary, out-takes, music videos, deleted scenes and rehearsals was released on 30 July 2007.  The second series was released on DVD on 17 November 2008.  On the same day a boxset was also released containing both series. A DVD with all five episodes from Series 3 was released on 27 July 2009.

Overseas
In the United States, Star Stories began airing on BBC America on 15 August 2008.

In Australia it is shown on ABC1 and repeated on ABC2.

See also
Being Tom Cruise

References

External links

Star Stories at Myspace
Star Stories at BBC America

2006 British television series debuts
2008 British television series endings
2000s British comedy television series
Channel 4 comedy
Television series by All3Media